Monte Forcola (2,906 m) is a peak in Graubünden, Switzerland, close to the Italian border. Approximately 200 metres south of the summit (at the Italian border) is located the triple watershed of the Adige, Po and Danube basins (2,896 m).

References

External links
Monte Forcola on Hikr

Mountains of the Alps
Mountains of Graubünden
Ortler Alps
Mountains partially in Italy
Mountains of Switzerland
Two-thousanders of Switzerland
Val Müstair